Natsumi Kawaguchi and Adrienn Nagy won the girls' doubles tennis title at the 2019 Australian Open, defeating Chloe Beck and Emma Navarro in the final, 6–4, 6–4.

Liang En-shuo and Wang Xinyu were the defending champions. However, Liang was no longer eligible to participate in junior tournaments, and Wang chose not to participate.

Seeds

Draw

Finals

Top half

Bottom half

References
 Main Draw

Girls' Doubles
Australian Open, 2019 Girls' Doubles